The 1915–16 season was the 43rd season of competitive football in Scotland and the 26th season of the Scottish Football League. For this season, Division Two was abandoned due to World War I.

Scottish Football League

Scottish Cup

There was no Scottish Cup competition played.

Other honours

County

Junior Cup

Petershill won the Junior Cup after a 2–0 win over Parkhead in the final.

Scotland national team

There were no official Scotland matches played, with the British Home Championship suspended due to World War I. Scotland did play an unofficial wartime international against England on 13 May 1916. England won 4–3 at Goodison Park, with Scotland represented by Ken Campbell, Billy Henry, Jimmy Frew, James Logan, James Galt, James Scott, James Reid, Percy Dawson, Willie Reid, Patrick Allan and Willie Wilson.

See also
1915–16 Aberdeen F.C. season
1915–16 Rangers F.C. season
Association football during World War I

References

External links
Scottish Football Historical Archive

 
Seasons in Scottish football
Wartime seasons in Scottish football